The NESCAC men's basketball tournament is the annual conference basketball championship tournament for the NCAA Division III New England Small College Athletic Conference. The tournament has been held annually since 2001. It is a single-elimination tournament and seeding is based on regular season records.

As conference champion, the winner receives the NESCAC's automatic bid to the NCAA Men's Division III Basketball Championship.

Results

Championship records

 Connecticut College has not yet qualified for the tournament finals

References

NCAA Division III men's basketball conference tournaments
Basketball Tournament, Men's
Recurring sporting events established in 2001